Adama Alex Diakhite (born 12 April 1997) is a Senegalese basketball player who plays for DUC Dakar of the Nationale 1 and the Basketball Africa League (BAL). A  center, he played college basketball in the Philippines before turning professional in 2022.

College career
In 2017, Diakhite started playing played collegiate basketball in the Philippines for Diliman College. He transferred to the University of the East Red Warriors in 2018. He averaged 17.6 points and 13.7 rebounds per game in his first season with UE.

Professional career
In December 2021, Diakhite was announced as a new member of the Senegalese champions DUC Dakar. On 5 March, Diakhite made his professional debut in the Basketball Africa League (BAL) by scoring 17 points in a loss against SLAC. On 11 March, he scored a career-high 30 points along with 11 rebounds and 2 blocks to power his team past REG. Over five games, he averaged a team-high 16.4 points and 6.2 rebounds per game for DUC.

On 28 October 2022, DUC won the Senegalese Cup, with Diakhite being honoured as Final MVP after scoring 18 points in the final.

BAL career statistics

|-
| style="text-align:left;"|2022
| style="text-align:left;"|DUC
| 5 || 3 || 28.0 || .574 || .333 || .647 || 6.2 || 0.4 || 1.0 || 0.4 || 16.4
|-
|- class="sortbottom"
| style="text-align:center;" colspan="2"|Career
| 5 || 3 || 28.0 || .574 || .333 || .647 || 6.2 || 0.4 || 1.0 || 0.4 || 16.4

References

External links

1997 births
DUC Dakar players
Senegalese men's basketball players
Centers (basketball)
Senegalese expatriate basketball people in the Philippines
Living people
UE Red Warriors basketball players